The 2016–17 LigaPro (also known as Ledman LigaPro for sponsorship reasons) was the 27th season of Portuguese football's second-tier league, and the third season under the current LigaPro title. A total of 22 teams competed in this division, including reserve sides from top-flight Primeira Liga teams.

Porto B were the defending champions, after winning their first title in the competition in the previous season.

Teams
A total of 22 teams contest the league, including 17 sides from the 2015–16 season, two teams relegated from the 2015–16 Primeira Liga (União da Madeira and Académica) and three promoted from the 2015–16 Campeonato de Portugal (Cova da Piedade, Vizela and Fafe).

Other team changes compared to the previous season included the promotion of Chaves and Feirense to the 2016–17 Primeira Liga, and the relegation of Farense, Mafra, Atlético CP, Oriental and Oliveirense to the 2016–17 Campeonato de Portugal.

On 15 March 2016, the LPFP announced that four teams (instead of three) will be relegated to the 2017–18 Campeonato de Portugal, and two teams (instead of three) will be promoted directly from the Campeonato de Portugal to reduce the number of LigaPro teams to 20 for the 2017–18 season. There will be also a two-legged promotion/relegation play-off involving the 17th- and 18th-placed teams of 2016–17 LigaPro and both second-placed teams of the Campeonato de Portugal promotion groups (North and South).

Team changes

Promoted from 2015–16 Campeonato de Portugal
 Cova da Piedade (Champions, South zone promotion group winner)
 Vizela (Runners-up, North zone promotion group winner)
 Fafe (Promotion play-off winner)

Relegated from 2015–16 Primeira Liga
 União da Madeira
 Académica

Promoted to 2016–17 Primeira Liga
 Chaves
 Feirense

Relegated to 2016–17 Campeonato de Portugal
 Farense
 Mafra
 Atlético CP
 Oriental
 Oliveirense

Stadia and locations

Personnel and sponsors

Coaching changes

Season summary

League table

Positions by round

Results

Relegation play-offs

Statistics

Top scorers

Monthly awards

Attendances

References 

Liga Portugal 2 seasons
2016–17 in Portuguese football leagues
Portugal